Guarea thompsonii, also called black guarea or dark bossé, is a species of plant in the family Meliaceae. It is found in Cameroon, the Republic of the Congo, the Democratic Republic of the Congo, Ivory Coast, Gabon, Ghana, Liberia, and Nigeria. It is threatened by habitat loss.

References

thompsonii
Vulnerable plants
Flora of Cameroon
Flora of the Republic of the Congo
Flora of the Democratic Republic of the Congo
Flora of Gabon
Flora of Ivory Coast
Flora of Ghana
Flora of Liberia
Flora of Nigeria
Taxonomy articles created by Polbot
Taxobox binomials not recognized by IUCN